The Hag of Beara (also known as The White Nun of Beara, The Cailleach or The Old Woman of Dingle) is a mythic Irish Goddess: a Cailleach, or divine hag, crone, or creator deity; literally a "hooded one" (caille translates as "hood"). She is associated with the Beara Peninsula in County Cork, Ireland, and was thought to bring winter. She is best known as the narrator of the medieval Irish poem "The Lament of the Hag of Beara", in which she bitterly laments the passing of her youth and her decrepit old age. The Great Book of Lecan (c. 1400 AD) contains a collection of stories concerning her. 

The Hag of Beara is said to have been born in Dingle, County Kerry, at "Teach Mor" or the Great House, described as "the house farthest west in Ireland", and today identified as Tivore on the Dingle peninsula. She is said to have worn a veil, given to her by Saint Cummine, for a hundred years — perhaps a Christian appropriation of her hood. 

Along with County Kerry, she is also closely associated with County Cork. She is said to have been a mother or foster mother to the ancestors of a number of prominent clans in the region, including the Corca Dhuibhne and Corca Loighdhe.  In some tellings, she lived several lives, or had several successive periods of youth, during which she birthed the ancestors of these clans.

Literature
The first extant written mention of the hag is in the 12th century "Vision of Mac Conglinne", in which she is named as the "White Nun of Beare".

The long Irish language medieval poem, "The Lament of the Hag of Beara", which she narrates, has been described by folklorist Eleanor Hull as "a beautiful example of the wide-spread idea that human life is ruled by the flow and ebb of the sea-tide, with the turn of which life will dwindle, as with the on-coming tide it waxes to its full powers and energy". The narrator is clearly unhappy with her lot, and remembers that in her youth she used to drink "mead and wine" with kings, she now lives a lonely life amid "the gloom of a prayer" and "shriveled old hags".

The following verses are excerpts from a 1919 translation by Lady Augusta Gregory. 

The manuscript in which the poem is found is held in Trinity College Dublin. The verses are preceded by a passage that identifies her original names as "Dirri", and connects her with three other poetesses: Brigit, Liadan, Uallach.

Another Irish poem, Mise Éire, composed by Patrick Pearse in 1912, was also translated by Lady Gregory, and reads

Landmarks

A number of pre-historic archaeological and geographical features in Munster are associated with her, in particular the "Hag of Beara" rock chair, in reality a natural boulder, in Kilcatherine, Béara, County Cork, which is said to be either her fossilized remains, or the chair of which she sits waiting for Manannán mac Lir, the god of the sea, variously described as her husband or father.

She is sometimes associated with the Hag's Head (Ceann Caillí) rock formation on the southerly most point of the Cliffs of Moher in County Clare.

See also
Cailleach - a broader examination of the different versions of this type of deity, particularly in Scottish mythology

References

Sources

 The Cailleach Béara or the Hag of Béara. Article on The Irish Place
 Augusta, Lady Gregory. The Kiltartan Poetry Book. New York: G. Putnam's Sons, 1919
 Hull, Eleanor. "Legends and Traditions of the Cailleach Bheara or Old Woman (Hag) of Beare". Folklore, Volume 38, No. 3, September 30, 1927. pp. 225–254
 O'Sullivan, Leanne. "On the Beara Peninsula: Written in Stone". New Hibernia Review; Iris Éireannach Nua, Volume 17, No. 3 2013. pp. 9–14
 Yeats, W. B. "Modern Ireland: An Address To American Audiences, 1932-33". The Massachusetts Review, Volume 5, No. 2, 1964
 Zucchelli, Christine. Sacred Stones of Ireland. Cork: Collins Press, 2016. 

Creator goddesses
Irish goddesses
Hags